Michael Biddulph (1610–1666) was an English politician who sat in the House of Commons  in 1660.

Biddulph was the son of Michael Biddulph of Market Street Lichfield, and his wife Elizabeth Skeffington, daughter of Sir William Skeffington, 1st Baronet of Fisherwick and was baptised on 6 November 1610. He was a soldier and was about to enlist in a royalist regiment in Wiltshire during the English Civil War when his family, who supported the parliamentary cause, recalled him.

In 1660, Biddulph was elected Member of Parliament for Lichfield in the Convention Parliament. 
 
Biddulph died unmarried at the age of 55 and was buried at Stowe on 3 November 1666.

References

1610 births
1666 deaths
English MPs 1660
People from Lichfield